Ritva Kaija Hannele Melender (née Lemettinen, born 9 September 1960 in Ylistaro) is a retired female marathon runner from Finland. She represented Finland at the 1992 Summer Olympics in Barcelona, Spain, finishing in 14th place in the women's marathon. She twice won the Chicago Marathon, in 1993 and 1995. Her personal best time is 2:28:00 set at the London Marathon in 1995. This is also the current Finnish national record.

Achievements

References

sports-reference

1960 births
Living people
People from Seinäjoki
Finnish female long-distance runners
Athletes (track and field) at the 1992 Summer Olympics
Olympic athletes of Finland
Chicago Marathon female winners
Sportspeople from South Ostrobothnia